The Small Last Judgement is a 1619 painting by Peter Paul Rubens. Its name distinguishes it from the same artist's The Great Last Judgement of 1617. It is now in the Alte Pinakothek in Munich.

External links
http://www.a-e-m-gmbh.com/wessely/frubens.htm

Paintings by Peter Paul Rubens
Collection of the Alte Pinakothek
1619 paintings